Santa Barbara station is a passenger rail station in Santa Barbara, California, served by two Amtrak lines, the Coast Starlight and the Pacific Surfliner.  The Coast Starlight runs once daily in each direction between Los Angeles and Seattle, Washington.  The Pacific Surfliner trains serving this station run ten times daily (five in each direction) between San Diego and the Santa Barbara suburb of Goleta, with two of those running in each direction to/from San Luis Obispo further to the north.  The station is fully staffed with ticketing and checked-baggage services.

History 

The station was built in 1902 by the Southern Pacific Railroad in the Spanish Mission Revival Style.  Design work was by Santa Barbara architect Francis W. Wilson.   It is located within walking distance of Santa Barbara Harbor, Stearns Wharf and State Street, Santa Barbara's main thoroughfare. The historic depot was renovated in 2000; the project included the restoration of the ticket office and upgrades to the plumbing, electrical and heating and cooling systems.

For most of the first decade of the Amtrak era, the station was only served by the Coast Starlight, which ran southbound during the evening rush and northbound at lunchtime. In 1988, Amtrak and Caltrans extended the San Diegan, previously a Los Angeles-San Diego service, to Santa Barbara, providing an additional round trip between the Central Coast and Los Angeles. Eventually, service was extended to nearby Goleta and later all the way to San Luis Obispo, resulting in the route being rebranded as the Pacific Surfliner in 2000.

Due to the length of the platform, when Amtrak's Coast Starlight train is stopped, it blocks the two streets to the north and south of the depot.

Of the 74 California stations served by Amtrak, Santa Barbara was the 15th-busiest in FY2012, boarding or detraining an average of approximately 834 passengers daily, and serving a total of 304,382 passengers in FY2012.

The station was placed on the National Register of Historic Places on August 2, 2006.

References

External links 

 SantaBarbara.com Train Station Guide

Amtrak stations in Santa Barbara County, California
Buildings and structures in Santa Barbara, California
Former Southern Pacific Railroad stations in California
National Register of Historic Places in Santa Barbara County, California
Railway stations on the National Register of Historic Places in California
Railway stations in the United States opened in 1902
1902 establishments in California
Mission Revival architecture in California